Rollinia velutina is a species of plant in the Annonaceae family. It is found in Colombia and Venezuela.

References

velutina
Flora of Venezuela
Flora of Colombia
Near threatened plants
Near threatened biota of South America
Taxonomy articles created by Polbot
Taxobox binomials not recognized by IUCN